The  2012 United States Open Championship was the 112th U.S. Open, played June 14–17 at the Olympic Club in San Francisco, California. Webb Simpson won his first major title, one stroke ahead of runners-up Graeme McDowell and Michael Thompson.

Venue
This was the fifth U.S. Open at the Olympic Club, all played at the Lake Course. In 1955, unheralded Jack Fleck defeated Ben Hogan in an 18-hole playoff. In 1966, Billy Casper staged one of the greatest comebacks in U.S. Open history, erasing a seven-stroke deficit on the final nine holes to tie Arnold Palmer, then prevailed in an 18-hole playoff. In 1987, Scott Simpson won by a stroke over 8-time major winner Tom Watson. In 1998, Lee Janzen won his second U.S. Open, one stroke ahead of Payne Stewart.

Course layout
Olympic Club - Lake Course

Lengths of the course for previous major championships:

, par 70 - 1998 U.S. Open
, par 70 - 1987 U.S. Open
, par 70 - 1966 U.S. Open
, par 70 - 1955 U.S. Open

One unique aspect of the course was that players began the first and second rounds on the 1st and 9th tees, rather than the 1st and 10th tees, as is typical. This was due to the 8th green and 9th tee being located far closer to the clubhouse than the 10th tee.

Changes to cuts
For 2012, the USGA changed the rule governing which players would make the cut after 36 holes. Now, only the top 60 players, plus those tied, would make the cut, instead of also including those players within ten strokes of the leader.

Field
About half the field each year consists of players who are fully exempt from qualifying for the U.S. Open. The players who have qualified for the 2012 U.S. Open are listed below. Each player is classified according to the first category in which he qualified, but other categories are shown in parentheses.

The qualification categories changed substantially in 2012. Seven categories (9 and 11 to 16, from 2011) were eliminated. These categories exempted top finishers on the money lists of various tours and multiple PGA Tour winners. Three categories were added (3, 4, and 9 below), for the winners of The Amateur Championship, the Mark H. McCormack Medal, and the BMW PGA Championship. Two categories were expanded (13 and 14 below), to include the top 60 instead of the top 50 in the Official World Golf Ranking.

1. Last 10 U.S. Open Champions
Ángel Cabrera (5), Michael Campbell, Jim Furyk (13,14), Lucas Glover, Retief Goosen, Graeme McDowell (13,14), Rory McIlroy (11,13,14), Geoff Ogilvy (12,13,14), Tiger Woods (7,13,14)

2. Top two finishers in the 2011 U.S. Amateur
Patrick Cantlay (a,4)
Kelly Kraft forfeited his invitation by turning pro in April 2012.

3. Winner of the 2011 British Amateur
Bryden Macpherson forfeited his invitation by turning pro in April 2012.

4. Winner of the 2011 Mark H. McCormack Medal

5. Last five Masters Champions
Trevor Immelman, Phil Mickelson (12,13,14), Charl Schwartzel (11,13,14), Bubba Watson (12,13,14)

6. Last five British Open Champions
Stewart Cink, Pádraig Harrington (7), Louis Oosthuizen (11,13,14)
Darren Clarke withdrew after a groin injury.

7. Last five PGA Champions
Keegan Bradley (12,13,14), Martin Kaymer (13,14), Y. E. Yang (11,12)

8. Last three Players Champions
K. J. Choi (12,13,14), Tim Clark, Matt Kuchar (12,13,14)

9. Winner of the 2012 BMW PGA Championship
Luke Donald (12,13,14)

10. The U.S. Senior Open Champion
Olin Browne

11. Top 10 finishers and ties in the 2011 U.S. Open
Kevin Chappell, Jason Day (12,13,14), Sergio García (13,14), Robert Garrigus, Peter Hanson (13,14), Lee Westwood (13,14)

12. All players qualifying for the 2011 edition of The Tour Championship
Aaron Baddeley (13,14), Jonathan Byrd (13,14), Jason Dufner (13,14), Bill Haas (13,14), Charles Howell III, Freddie Jacobson (13,14), Dustin Johnson (13,14), Hunter Mahan (13,14), Chez Reavie, Justin Rose (13,14), Adam Scott (13,14), John Senden (13,14), Webb Simpson (13,14), Vijay Singh, Steve Stricker (13,14), David Toms (13,14), Bo Van Pelt (13,14), Nick Watney (13,14), Mark Wilson (13,14), Gary Woodland
Brandt Snedeker (13,14) withdrew with a rib injury.

13. Top 60 on the Official World Golf Ranking list as of May 21, 2012
Bae Sang-moon (14), Thomas Bjørn (14), Rafa Cabrera-Bello (14), Nicolas Colsaerts (14), Ben Crane (14), Simon Dyson (14), Ernie Els (14), Gonzalo Fernández-Castaño (14), Rickie Fowler (14), Anders Hansen (14), Ryo Ishikawa, Miguel Ángel Jiménez, Zach Johnson (14), Robert Karlsson (14), Kim Kyung-tae (14), Martin Laird (14), Francesco Molinari (14), Kevin Na (14), Carl Pettersson (14), Ian Poulter (14), Álvaro Quirós (14), Robert Rock (14), Kyle Stanley (14)
Paul Lawrie (ranked 40) decided not to play.
Paul Casey (ranked 54) withdrew after a shoulder injury.

14. Top 60 on the Official World Golf Ranking list as of June 11, 2012
Branden Grace, Spencer Levin

15. Special exemptions selected by the USGA
None

Sectional qualifiers
Japan: Hiroyuki Fujita, Brendan Jones, Lee Dong-hwan, Park Jae-bum, Tadahiro Takayama, Toru Taniguchi
England: Matthew Baldwin, Grégory Bourdy, George Coetzee, Mikko Ilonen, Raphaël Jacquelin, Søren Kjeldsen, Peter Lawrie, Matteo Manassero, Alex Norén, Lee Slattery, Marc Warren
United States
Daly City, California: Michael Allen, Matt Bettencourt, Alex Čejka, James Hahn, Beau Hossler (a), Alberto Sanchez (a), Scott Smith (L)
Lecanto, Florida: Brooks Koepka (a), Scott Langley (L), Sam Osborne (L)
Suwanee, Georgia: Jason Bohn, Tim Weinhart, Casey Wittenberg
Glen Ellyn, Illinois: Tim Herron, Anthony Summers
Rockville, Maryland: Shane Bertsch, Paul Claxton, Jeff Curl (L), Cole Howard, Darron Stiles, Michael Thompson, Nicholas Thompson (L)
Summit, New Jersey: Brian Gaffney (L), Jim Herman (L), Mark McCormick (L), Cameron Wilson (a)
Columbus, Ohio: Blake Adams, Martin Flores, Brian Harman, Morgan Hoffmann (L), Steve LeBrun (L), Edward Loar, Davis Love III, Steve Marino, David Mathis, Dennis Miller, Jesse Mueller (L), Rod Pampling, Scott Piercy, D. A. Points, Kevin Streelman, Charlie Wi
Springfield, Ohio: Brice Garnett, John Peterson (L)
Creswell, Oregon: Casey Martin, Nick Sherwood (a)
Memphis, Tennessee: Stephen Ames, Tommy Biershenk, Roberto Castro, Joe Durant, Hunter Haas, Hunter Hamrick (L), Bill Lunde, Joe Ogilvie, Aaron Watkins
Houston, Texas: Bob Estes, Alistair Presnell, Brian Rowell

Alternates who gained entry

Justin Hicks (Columbus) – claimed spot held for category 14
Colt Knost (Columbus) – claimed spot held for category 14
Kyle Thompson (Memphis) – claimed spot held for category 14
Jordan Spieth (a, Houston) – replaced Brandt Snedeker
Andy Zhang (a,L, Lecanto) – replaced Paul Casey. At 14, Zhang became the youngest golfer to compete in the U.S. Open since at least World War II.

(a) denotes amateur
(L) denotes player advanced through local qualifying

Past champions in the field

Made the cut

Missed the cut

Nationalities in the field

Round summaries

First round
Thursday, June 14, 2012

Source:

Second round
Friday, June 15, 2012

Source:

Amateurs:  Hossler (+3), Spieth (+8), Cantlay (+8), Sanchez (+9), Wilson (+14), Koepka (+14), Zhang (+17), Sherwood (+18)

Third round
Saturday, June 16, 2012

Source:

Final round
Sunday, June 17, 2012

Source:

Amateurs: Spieth (+7), Hossler (+9), Cantlay (+11)

Scorecard
Final round

Cumulative tournament scores, relative to par

Source:

References

External links
  – 2012 U.S. Open
 Coverage on the PGA Tour's official site
 Coverage on the European Tour's official site
 United States Golf Association

U.S. Open (golf)
Golf in California
Sports competitions in San Francisco
U.S. Open
U.S. Open (golf)
U.S. Open (golf)
U.S. Open (golf)